Hank Bachmeier (born July 14, 1999) is an American football quarterback who plays for the Louisiana Tech Bulldogs of Conference USA. He formerly played for the Boise State Broncos in the Mountain West Conference (MW). He left Boise State mid-season and entered the NCAA football transfer portal on September 27, 2022. 

Bachmeier's ride in Boise came to an abrupt end in September 2022, after he started the first four games of the season. Bachmeier entered the transfer portal just days after former Bronco offensive coordinator Tim Plough was fired. He was pulled in the first quarter of the season-opener against Oregon State, and led the Broncos to their worst passing performance since 1997 when they only threw for 93 yards in a 27-10 last Friday at UTEP. It was announced on January 19, 2023, that Bachmeier would transfer to Louisiana Tech University.

Early years
Bachmeier was born to Michael and April Bachmeier, and was home-schooled until high school.

High school career
Bachmeier attended Murrieta Valley High School in Murrieta, California. As a four-year starter, he amassed 13,150 passing yards along with 2,190 rushing yards, totaling 15,340 all-purpose yards. He passed for 156 touchdowns and threw 30 interceptions while running for 32 more touchdowns, totaling 188 combined touchdowns.

Bachmeier was rated by both 247Sports and Scout as a four-star recruit coming out of high school. He verbally committed to Boise State University in May 2018, officially signed in December and then enrolled in January 2019. He noted his relationships and offensive scheme, in addition to Boise State's ability to develop players and the city of Boise as reasons for choosing Boise State.

College career

Boise State

Louisiana Tech 
On January 19, 2023, Bachmeier transferred to Louisiana Tech.

Statistics

Personal life
Bachmeier is the oldest of five siblings. He has a sister and three brothers.

References

External links
Boise State Broncos bio

1999 births
Living people
People from Murrieta, California
Players of American football from California
Sportspeople from Riverside County, California
American sportspeople of Filipino descent
American football quarterbacks
Boise State Broncos football players
Louisiana Tech Bulldogs football players